Styrian may refer to:

 Adjective for Styria
 Styrian dialect group

See also
 Styria (disambiguation)